Saxony were a short lived Australian pop rock band formed in Adelaide, South Australia in 1975. The group released two singles, both of which peaked inside the Australian top 100.

Discography

Singles

References

Australian pop music groups
Musical groups established in 1975
Musical groups disestablished in 1976